The International Institute of Business Analysis (IIBA) is a professional association formed in October 2003 with the stated goal of supporting and promoting the discipline of business analysis.

IIBA offers help and information to business analysts in order to develop their skills and further their careers. It issued A Guide to the Business Analysis Body of Knowledge (BABOK). IIBA offers certification for business analysis professionals, including the Certification of Competency in Business Analysis (CCBA) and Certified Business Analysis Professional (CBAP) designations.

IIBA has local chapters in multiple countries. It is a member organization of the Federation of Enterprise Architecture Professional Organizations (FEAPO).

History

The IIBA organization was founded in 2003, and the Body of Knowledge Committee was founded in 2004.
In 2005 the BABOK Guide was released and the CBAP certification graduate program was implemented.
Membership grew to over 5,000 members by 2008, and to 16,000 by 2011.  the Institute had 27,000 members, with 109 chapters on 6 continents.

See also
A Guide to the Business Analysis Body of Knowledge (BABOK)

References

External links
 Institute website

Standards organizations in Canada
Business analysis
Business and finance professional associations
Professional associations based in Canada
Bodies of knowledge